Sir Robert Christopher 'Robin' Mackworth-Young  (12 February 1920 – 5 December 2000) was a British academic and librarian, who served as Royal Librarian between 1958 and 1985.

Early life and education 
Mackworth-Young was the son of Gerard Mackworth Young, a civil servant in British India. He was educated at Eton College and King's College, Cambridge, where he was President of the Union.

Second World War 
Upon the outbreak of the Second World War, Mackworth-Young joined the Royal Air Force. He saw active service in the Middle East and in the Normandy Campaign, leaving the RAF as a Squadron Leader in 1948. He subsequently joined the Foreign Office.

Royal Librarian 
In 1955, Mackworth-Young was appointed to be a librarian in the Royal Household at Windsor Castle. In 1958 he succeeded Sir Owen Morshead as Royal Librarian. In 1961 he was made a Member of the Royal Victorian Order, and was promoted to Knight Commander in 1975 and Knight Grand Cross in 1985. He was a member of the Roxburghe Club from 1965. From his retirement in 1985 to his death he was given the honorary title of Emeritus Librarian by Elizabeth II. In 1978 He received the Queen Elizabeth II Version of the Royal Household Long and Faithful Service Medal for 20 years service to the British Royal Family.

Publications
Sandringham (1978)
The History & Treasures Of Windsor Castle (1980)
Windsor Castle (1997)

References

1920 births
2000 deaths
Alumni of King's College, Cambridge
British diplomats
Royal Air Force personnel of World War II
Knights Grand Cross of the Royal Victorian Order
People educated at Eton College
Royal Air Force officers
Royal Librarians
British people in colonial India